Epiblastus sciadanthus is a species of epiphytic orchid in the genus Epiblastus and is found in the Solomon Islands, Fiji, Samoa and Vanuatu.

References

sciadanthus
Orchids of New Guinea
Plants described in 1882